Philosophy: An Introduction to the Art of Wondering is an undergraduate philosophy textbook, originally published in 1973, authored by James L. Christian. It takes a unique synoptic approach: the author believes that philosophy is critical thinking about the "Big Picture". The goal of the book is not merely to introduce the history of formal thinking in western culture, but also to provide students with practical approaches and tools for dealing with some of the enduring questions as they manifest in everyday life. Thus the book focuses on this "big picture" and the interdisciplinary origins of philosophical thinking. He thus addresses the concerns that most people "wonder" about:  Does life have meaning? Does God exist? How do you know right from wrong? and so on. The presentation is interwoven with cartoons, quotations, and related findings from the social and physical sciences that ensure central philosophical concepts are accessible. New learning objectives in this edition further strengthen the book's reader-friendly approach. An eclectic range of topics reinforces the author's presentation of philosophy as the individual's attempt to unify disparate world views, with interspersed biographies that provide glimpses into the lives of great thinkers who have molded the Western philosophical tradition and largely influenced how society thinks today.

It has many editions published from 1973-2011.

References

Philosophy textbooks
1973 non-fiction books
Contemporary philosophical literature